Neocalyptis liratana is a species of moth of the  family Tortricidae. It is found in India (Assam), Russia (Amur) and Japan.

The wingspan is 13–22 mm.

References

	

Moths described in 1881
Neocalyptis